Matthew J. Titone (born January 24, 1961) is an American politician and lawyer from Staten Island, New York. A Democrat, he served as a member of the New York State Assembly from the 61st District, on Staten Island's North Shore from April 1, 2007 to January 1, 2019. Titone currently serves as a surrogate court judge of Richmond County.

Early life, education, career
Titone was born on Staten Island, the son of Vito J. Titone, a former judge of the New York State Court of Appeals. Titone was raised in the Grymes Hill and West Brighton neighborhoods. He went on to attend St. John's University School of Law, while working full-time as a law clerk for the late John S. Zachary.

After being admitted to the New York State Bar Association in 1992, Titone worked pro bono for the Staten Island AIDS Task Force and Project Hospitality. In 1993, he joined the Wall Street law firm of Morgan, Melhuish, Monahan, Arvidson, Abrutyn & Lisowski, where he was a senior trial associate and managed the firm's labor law litigation department. In 1998, he established a private law practice on Staten Island.

Titone garnered national attention when he took on the New York State adoption industry representing a family who adopted a baby boy. The family was never informed by the adoption agency that the child was born with the AIDS virus and resulted in the child being untreated for his illness for eleven years after the adoption was completed. Not only did Titone provide legal support and guidance for the family, he also helped the young man establish the Justin LiGreci HIV/AIDS Foundation for Children and Teens, a not for profit organization that provides educational services to the youth of Staten Island and New York metropolitan area.

Political career
Titone was the Democratic nominee for the New York State Senate in 2006, losing the 24th District race to Republican Andrew Lanza.

Following the death of Assemblyman John Lavelle in January 2007, Titone was selected as the Democratic nominee for the special election held to fill the vacancy.  On the third ballot of Democratic committeemembers, Daniel Lavelle, son of the late Assemblymember, dropped out and Titone was unopposed. Titone was backed by City Councilman Mike McMahon, whose support was crucial. Mimi Cusick, mother of assembly member Mike Cusick and "mother of the party", also endorsed Titone's candidacy.

In the election held on March 27, 2007, Titone received 49% of the vote in a three-way contest to succeed Lavelle, comfortably defeating his Republican and Independence party opponents who won 32% and 19% respectively.

2018 Richmond County Surrogate election
In March 2018, Titone announced that he would vacate his Assembly seat that fall to seek election as Richmond County (Staten Island) Surrogate.  Titone’s announcement was quickly followed by endorsements from Diane Savino, Michael Cusick, Debi Rose, and former Conservative Party Staten Island Borough President James Molinaro.

Personal
Titone is openly gay and married his partner of 18 years, Giosue Pugliese, in a ceremony at Staten Island Borough Hall in September 2011, shortly after same-sex marriage was legalized in New York State. He was one of five LGBT members of the New York Legislature, alongside Assemblymembers Deborah Glick, Daniel O'Donnell, and Harry Bronson, as well as Senator Brad Hoylman. His Assembly campaigns have won the support of the Gay & Lesbian Victory Fund, which provides financial and strategic assistance. He is the first openly gay man elected to higher office on Staten Island.

Election results
 November 2006 general election, NYS Senate, 24th SD
{| class="Wikitable"
| Andrew J. Lanza (REP - IND) || ... || 34,160
|-
| Matthew J. Titone (DEM - WOR) || ... || 23,074
|-
| Charles T. Pistor, Jr. (CON) || ... || 2,307
|}

 March 2007 special election, NYS Assembly, 61st AD
{| class="Wikitable"
| Matthew Titone (DEM - WOR) || ... || 3,088
|-
| Rose Margarella (REP - CON) || ... || 1,934
|-
| Kelvin Alexander (IND) || ... || 1,160
|}

 November 2008 general election, NYS Assembly, 61st AD
{| class="Wikitable"
| Matthew J. Titone (DEM - WOR) || ... || 25,974
|-
| Thomas W. McGinley (REP) || ... || 8,578
|-
| Rose Margarella (IND) || ... || 985
|}

 November 2010 general election, NYS Assembly, 61st AD
{| class="Wikitable"
| Matthew J. Titone (DEM - IND - WOR) || ... || 19,881
|-
| Dave Narby (LBT) || ... || 1,494
|}

 November 2012 general election, NYS Assembly, 61st AD
{| class="Wikitable"
| Matthew J. Titone (DEM - IND - WOR) || ... || 28,616
|-
| Paul Saryian	 (REP) || ... || 7,204
|}

 November 2014 general election, NYS Assembly, 61st AD
{| class="Wikitable"
| Matthew J. Titone (DEM - IND - WOR) || ... || 16,429
|}

See also
 LGBT culture in New York City
 LGBT rights in New York
 List of LGBT people from New York City

References

1961 births
Living people
American people of Italian descent
Gay politicians
LGBT state legislators in New York (state)
Democratic Party members of the New York State Assembly
People from Grymes Hill, Staten Island
St. John's University School of Law alumni
21st-century American politicians
People from West New Brighton, Staten Island
Politicians from Staten Island